The Surrey County Intermediate League (Western) is one of the three intermediate football leagues which has most of its teams in the English county of Surrey and is the smaller of the two feeder leagues to the Surrey Elite Intermediate League.

The current champions are Keens Park Rangers.

History
The league can trace its roots back to 1891 when the East and West Surrey League was formed then 're-constructed' into the West Surrey League in 1905. That, in turn, became the Surrey Intermediate League at the same time as the Surrey Senior League was formed, 1922.

Structure
The league has two divisions for first teams and one division for reserves. The Premier Division is at the 12th level of the English football league system. Teams may be promoted to the Surrey Elite Intermediate League. Division One teams may be relegated to and replaced by teams from the Guildford & Woking Alliance.

2022–23 members

Premier Division
AFC Spelthorne Sports
Cranleigh
Hambledon
Keens Park Rangers
Manorcroft United
Merrow
Shottermill & Haslemere
Tongham
Worplesdon Phoenix
Wrecclesham

Division One
Chiddingfold
Dial Square
Farncombe
Godalming Town Development
Knaphill Athletic
Laleham & Kempton
Lightwater United
University of Surrey
Virginia Water Reserves

Champions

East and West Surrey League

West Surrey League

Surrey Intermediate League

References

External links
Football Mitoo

 
Football in Surrey
Football leagues in England